Aldo Pastore (15 December 1930 – 26 July 2022) was an Italian politician. He served as a member of the Chamber of Deputies of Italy. Pastore died on 26 July 2022, at the age of 91.

References 

1930 births
2022 deaths
Members of the Chamber of Deputies (Italy)
Deputies of Legislature VIII of Italy
Deputies of Legislature IX of Italy
Italian Communist Party politicians
Democratic Party of the Left politicians
20th-century Italian politicians
People from Savona